Alteriqipengyuania lutimaris is a Gram-negative, oval-shaped and non-motile bacteria from the genus Alteriqipengyuania which has been isolated from tidal flat sediment from the Yellow Sea in Korea.

References

Further reading 
 

Sphingomonadales
Bacteria described in 2014